Yevgeny Nosov (born 4 January 1983) is a Belarusian rower. He competed in the men's coxless four event at the 2008 Summer Olympics.

References

1983 births
Living people
Belarusian male rowers
Olympic rowers of Belarus
Rowers at the 2008 Summer Olympics
Sportspeople from Gomel